Galleria Department Store is an upmarket South Korean department store franchise owned by Hanwha Group. It has 5 branches throughout Korea, notably the Luxury Hall West and Luxury Hall East, both in Apgujeong-dong, as upmarket luxury-brand fashion malls in Seoul.

Stores
 Luxury Hall East and West in Apgujeong-dong, Gangnam-gu, Seoul 
 Gwang-gyo Store in Yeongtong-gu, Suwon, Gyeonggi-do
 Time World Store in Seo-gu, Daejeon
 Center City Store  in Seobuk-gu, Cheon-an, Chungcheongnam-do (reopened in new location in 2011)
 Jinju Store in Jinju, Gyeongsangnam-do

Defunct store
Jamsil Store in Songpa-gu, Seoul (opened in 1983, closed in September 2000)
Galleria Concos in Yongsan-gu, Seoul (Seoul Station)(closed in 2012 Change as Lotte Outllet Seoul st.)
Dongbaek Store in Jung-gu, Daejeon (closed in 2013 Change as NC-mall Jungang-ro)

Facilities
 Luxury Hall West and Luxury Hall East: the branch stocks a number of luxury brands including Hermes, Channel, Louis Vuitton, Dior, Goyard, Gucci and Fendi. As well as others such as Cartier, Van Cleef&Arpels, Graff, Patek Philippe, Vacheron Constantin and Breguet. Gourmet 494: a premium food boutique, located in the basement.

References

External links
 Galleria Department Store official website

Gangnam District
Hanwha subsidiaries
Department stores of South Korea